Megamyrmaekion is a genus of ground spiders that was first described by A. Reuss in 1834.

Species
 it contains twelve species:
Megamyrmaekion algericum Simon, 1885 – Algeria, Tunisia
Megamyrmaekion austrinum Simon, 1908 – Australia (Western Australia)
Megamyrmaekion caudatum Reuss, 1834 (type) – Algeria, Tunisia, Libya, Egypt, Israel, Iran, India
Megamyrmaekion hula Levy, 2009 – Israel
Megamyrmaekion magshimim Levy, 2009 – Israel
Megamyrmaekion nairobii Berland, 1920 – East Africa
Megamyrmaekion pritiae (Tikader, 1982) – India
Megamyrmaekion schreineri Tucker, 1923 – South Africa
Megamyrmaekion tikaderi (Gajbe, 1987) – India
Megamyrmaekion transvaalense Tucker, 1923 – South Africa
Megamyrmaekion velox Simon, 1887 – South Africa
Megamyrmaekion vulpinum (O. Pickard-Cambridge, 1874) – Niger, Egypt

References

Araneomorphae genera
Gnaphosidae
Spiders of Africa
Spiders of Asia
Spiders of Australia